Dee Whitfield "Pete" Hart (born April 19, 1933) is a former American football player who played with the New York Titans. He played college football at Hardin–Simmons University.

References

1933 births
Living people
American football fullbacks
Hardin–Simmons Cowboys football players
New York Titans (AFL) players
Players of American football from Texas
People from Stonewall County, Texas